Volha Masiukovich (born ) is a Belarusian female  track cyclist. 

She competed at the 2013 and 2014 UCI Track Cycling World Championships.

Career results
2014
2nd  Team Pursuit, UEC European U23 Track Championships (with Palina Pivavarava, Ina Savenka and Marina Shmayankova)
3rd Scratch Race, Grand Prix Minsk

References

External links

1992 births
Living people
Belarusian track cyclists
Belarusian female cyclists
Place of birth missing (living people)
Cyclists at the 2010 Summer Youth Olympics